Hugo Nunes Coelho (born 30 October 1980) is a Portuguese footballer who plays as a central defender.

Football career
Born in Mafamude, Vila Nova de Gaia, Porto District, Coelho played mostly at amateur level in his country, his biggest achievement being appearing in 12 matches in the second division for A.D. Ovarense in 2005–06, in a relegation-ending season.

He played top flight football in Hong Kong (one year) and Cyprus (three).

External links

1980 births
Living people
Portuguese footballers
Association football defenders
Académico de Viseu F.C. players
CU Micaelense players
A.D. Ovarense players
South China AA players
Olympiakos Nicosia players
AEP Paphos FC players
Sektzia Ness Ziona F.C. players
Liga Portugal 2 players
Segunda Divisão players
Hong Kong First Division League players
Cypriot First Division players
Cypriot Second Division players
Liga Leumit players
Portuguese expatriate footballers
Expatriate footballers in Hong Kong
Expatriate footballers in Cyprus
Expatriate footballers in Israel
Portuguese expatriate sportspeople in Hong Kong
Portuguese expatriate sportspeople in Cyprus
Portuguese expatriate sportspeople in Israel
Sportspeople from Vila Nova de Gaia